D-inositol-3-phosphate glycosyltransferase (mycothiol glycosyltransferases, MshA) is an enzyme with systematic name UDP-N-acetyl-D-glucosamine:1D-myo-inositol 3-phosphate alpha-D-glycosyltransferase. This enzyme catalyses the following chemical reaction

 UDP-N-acetyl-D-glucosamine + 1D-myo-inositol 3-phosphate  1-O-(2-acetamido-2-deoxy-alpha-D-glucopyranosyl)-1D-myo-inositol 3-phosphate + UDP

This enzyme catalyses the first dedicated reaction in the biosynthesis of mycothiol.

References

External links 
 

EC 2.4.1